Hypotia massilialis is a species of snout moth in the genus Hypotia. This species was first described in 1832 by the French entomologist Duponchel. Hypotia massilialis is present in the  France, Spain, Croatia, Hungary, Romania, Bulgaria, North Macedonia, Ukraine, Russia and Turkey.

References

Moths described in 1832
Hypotiini
Moths of Europe
Moths of Asia